is a Shinto shrine located in Kirishima, Kagoshima Prefecture, Japan.

Historically, the entire of Mount Kirishima is considered part of the shrine grounds. Today, parts of the mountains where festivals take place and the location of the Tenson kōrin is considered part of the shrine grounds.

It is dedicated to Konohanasakuya-hime, Hoori, Toyotama-hime, Ugayafukiaezu, Tamayori-bime and Ninigi-no-Mikoto. This shrine holds several Important Cultural Properties, such as the honden, heiden, haiden,  etc. It has been destroyed several times by volcanic eruptions.

External links

Official Website 
Japan-guide.com:Kirishima Shrine 

Shinto shrines in Kagoshima Prefecture
Important Cultural Properties of Japan
Beppyo shrines
Kanpei-taisha